Buchach is an eparchy of the Ukrainian Greek Catholic Church situated in Ukraine. The eparchy is suffragan to the Ukrainian Catholic Archeparchy of Ternopil – Zboriv. The eparchy was established on 21 July 2000.

The first and only eparch was Iryney Bilyk, O.S.B.M., who was eparch from 2000 to 2007. However, after his transfer to Rome in July 2007, Bishop Dmytro Hryhorak, O.S.B.M., became the eparch on 23 July 2011.

History
21 July 2000: Established as Eparchy of Buchach from the Ukrainian Catholic Eparchy of Ternopil.

Eparchial and auxiliary bishops
The following is a list of the bishops of Buchach and their terms of service:
(21 Jul 2000 – 28 Jul 2007) Iryney Bilyk, O.S.B.M.
 (28 Jul 2007 – 23 Jul 2011) Fr. Dmytro Hryhorak, O.S.B.M., Apostolic Administrator 
(since 23 Jul 2011 – ) Dmytro Hryhorak, O.S.B.M.

References

External links
Official website 

Buchach
Dioceses established in the 21st century
Roman Catholic dioceses and prelatures established in the 20th century
Buchach